Suba Calle 116, formerly named Shaio, is part of the TransMilenio mass-transit system of Bogotá, Colombia, which opened in the year 2000.

Location
The station is located in northwestern Bogotá, specifically between Calle 115 and Calle 116. 

It serves the Ilarco, Pontevedra, and Santa Rosa neighborhoods.

History
In 2006, phase two of the TransMilenio system was completed, including the Avenida Suba line, on which this station is located.

The station Suba Calle 116 is found in proximity to the Clínica Shaio, a cardiovascular health center, also the Colegio Agustiniano Norte, and the TELECOM (Colombia Telecomunicaciones S.A. ESP) offices and networking facilities.

Station services

Main line service

Feeder routes

This station does not have connections to feeder routes.

Inter-city service

This station does not have inter-city service.

See also
Bogotá
TransMilenio
List of TransMilenio Stations

External links
TransMilenio
Clínica Shaio
Colegio Agustiniano Norte

TransMilenio